Ogaminana is a larger town  in Kogi State, Nigeria. It is the headquarters of the Adavi Local Government Area.

The town has an official Post Office.

References

Populated places in Kogi State